The International Board on Books for Young People (IBBY) is a non-profit organisation to bring books and children together.  In 1966, IBBY Australia was established and Ena Noël OAM became its first president and remained in this role for over 20 years.

IBBY Award Honours
In 1986 both Hans Christian Andersen Awards were won by Australians.  Patricia Wrightson for writing and Robert Ingpen for illustration.

IBBY Honour List – Australian Titles 

The IBBY Honour List is a biennial selection of outstanding, recently published books, honoring writers, illustrators and translators from IBBY member countries. The titles are selected by the National Sections of IBBY who are invited to nominate books characteristic of their country and suitable to recommend for publication in different languages. One book can be nominated for each of the three categories: writing, illustration and translation.

Over the years many Australian children's authors and illustrators have been included in the Honour List:

 1962 Under the entry for Great Britain Writer: Nan Chauncy. Tangara, illustrated by Brian Wildsmith. London OUP 1961
 1970 Writer: Patricia Wrightson I Own the Racecourse. London Hutchinson. 1969
 1971 Illustrator: Ted Greenwood Joseph and Lulu and the Prindiville House Pigeons. Sydney A & R 1972
 1972 Writer: Colin Thiele Blue Fin. Adelaide Rigby 1969
 1973 Illustrator: Kilmeny & Deborah Niland Mulga Bill's Bicycle by A. B Paterson Sydney Collins 1973
 1974 Writer: Ivan Southall Josh. A & R
 1976 Illustrator: Robert Ingpen The Runaway Punt  Adelaide Rigby
 1976 Writer: Patricia Wrightson The Nargun and the Stars. Syd. Hutchinson.
 1978 Illustrator: Percy Trezise and Dick Roughsey The Quinkins Sydney. William Collins. 1978
 1978 Writer: Eleanor Spence The October Child Melbourne OUP
 1980 Illustrator: Heather Philpott The Rainforest Children OUP 1980
 1980 Writer: Lilith Norman A Dream of Seas. Sydney Collins
 1982 Illustrator: Pamela Allen Who Sank the Boat  Thomas Nelson 1982
 1982 Writer: Ruth Park Playing Beatie Bow Thomas Nelson
 1984 Illustrator: Julie Vivas Possum Magic, text by Mem Fox. Omnibus 1983
 1984 Writer: Joan Phipson The Watcher in the Garden Methuen
 1986 Illustrator: Bob Graham First there was Frances  Lothian 1985
 1986 Writer: Nadia Wheatley Dancing in the Anzac Deli. Melbourne. OUP
 1987 Illustrator: Jeannie Baker Where the Forest meets the Sea. Julia MacRae 1987
 1988 Writer: Alan Baillie Riverman Thomas Nelson
 1990 Illustrator: Rodney McRae Aesop's Fables  Margaret Hamilton 1990
 1990 Writer: Nadia Wheatley and Donna Rawlins My Place. Melbourne Collins Dove
 1992 Illustrator: Patricia Torres Do Not Go Around the Edges, text by Daisy Utemorrah. Magabala Books 1990
 1992 Writer: Libby Gleeson Dodger Turton & Chambers.
 1993 Illustrator: Peter Gouldthorpe First Light, text by Gary Crew Lothian. 1993
 1994 Writer: Garry Disher Bamboo Flute. A & R
 1995 Illustrator: John Winch  The Old Woman Who Loved to Read  Scholastic 1996
 1996 Writer: Emily Rodda Rowan of Rin. Omnibus
 1998 Illustrator: Graeme Base The Worst Band in the Universe Viking 1999
 1998 Writer: Peter Carey The Big Bazoohley. UQP
 1999 Illustrator: Ron Brooks Fox, text by Margaret Wild Allen & Unwin 2000
 2000 Writer: Margaret Wild First Day  Allen & Unwin
 2002 Illustrator: Andrew McLean A Year on Our Farm, text by Penny Matthews Omnibus 2002
 2002 Writer: David Metzenthen Stony Heart Country  Penguin
 2004 Illustrator: Jan Ormerod Lizzie Nonsense Little Hare Press 2004
 2004 Writer: Simon French Where in the World? Little Hare Press
 2006 Writer: Sonya Hartnett The Silver Donkey. Viking
 2008 No candidates submitted

International Children's Book Day
In 1987, Australia hosted  International Children's Book Day.

IBBY Australia Presidents
 Ena Noël OAM (1966–1990) 
 Juliana Bayfield (1990–2001)
 Dr John Foster (2001–2006)
 Dr Margaret Zeegers (2006–2008)
 Dr Robin Morrow (2009 – current)

Ena Noël Award for Encouragement

In 1994, founding president of IBBY Australia, Ena Noël, founded her own biennial prize - the Ena Noel Award - to encourage young emerging writers and illustrators. The name was chosen so that it was apparent to all concerned that someone highly regarded in the field was fostering young Australian authors and illustrators for children. The award is a mounted silver medallion designed by the first winner of the award, the Australian Aboriginal writer/illustrator Arone Raymond Meeks.

From 1994–2008 this biennial award was presented during the congress of the Australian Library and Information Association (ALIA).  In 2010, the award will be presented at an independent IBBY Australia function.

Only books by Australian creators published in the two years prior to the particular closing date can be nominated by the publishers for the Ena Noël award. Secondly, the nominated creator must be under the age of 35 at the time the title (or titles) for which they are nominated was published. Thirdly, any nominated author or illustrator has to be deemed by the judges to be worthy of encouragement.

The award winners:
 1994 Arone Raymond Meeks, won for his third picturebook, Enora and the Black Crane (1991)
 1996 Sonya Hartnett, won for Wilful Blue (1994)
 1997 Steve Woolman, won a special award for his body of work 
 1998 Tohby Riddle, for The Tip at the End of the Street (1996) 
 2000 Catherine Jinks for Piggy in the Middle (1998)
 2002 Beth Norling, for Cherryblossom and the Golden Bear (2000)
 2004 Alyssa Brugman, for Walking Naked
 2006 Anthony Eaton, for Fireshadow and The girl in the cave
 2008 Markus Zusak for The Book Thief
 2010 Lili Wilkinson for Scatterheart
 2012 Amy Barker for Omega Park
 2014 Melissa Keil for Life in Outer Space
 2016 Kate Gordon for Writing Clementine
 2018 Will Kostakis for The Sidekicks
 2020 Jack Heath for 500 Minutes of Danger
 2022 Gary Lonesborough for The Boy from the Mish

References

Hans Christian Andersen Awards IBBY. Retrieved 30 July 2009.
 
 The Ena Noel Award for Encouragement (Australia) John Foster. Bookbird. Basel: 2007. Vol. 45, Iss. 3; p. 46
 The Australian IBBY Encouragement Award for Children's Literature Ena Noel. Bookbird. Basel: May 2003. Vol. 41, Iss. 2; p. 62

External links
IBBY Official website
IBBY Australia Official website

Australian literature
Organizations established in 1966
1966 establishments in Australia
Child-related organisations in Australia